There are numerous, conflicting accounts on the outcome of the November–December 1917 election to the All-Russian Constituent Assembly. The Constituent Assembly election, which took place in the midst of the First World War and the October Revolution, was the largest exercise of universal suffrage in the history of mankind until that date. Spanning over decades, different historical research projects have been undertaken to try to map the puzzle of outcomes of the election from the various constituencies.

National results summary
The numbers in the table below represent accounts from the voting in 71 out of 81 electoral districts, although not all of those districts have complete voting tallies.

Studies on the Constituent Assembly election outcome

Svyatitsky and Lenin
There are various different accounts of the election result, with varying numbers.  Many accounts on the election result originate from N. V. Svyatitsky's account, who was himself elected as an SR deputy to the Constituent Assembly. His article was included in the one-year anniversary symposium of the Russian Revolution organized by the SR party (Moscow, Zemlya i Volya Publishers, 1918). Lenin (1919) describes Svyatitsky's account as extremely interesting. It presented results from 54 electoral districts, covering most of European Russia and Siberia. Notably is lacked details from the Olonets, Estonian, Kaluga, Bessarabian, Podolsk, Orenburg, Yakutsk, Don governorates, as well as Transcaucasus. All in all, Svyatitsky's account includes 36,257,960 votes. According to Lenin, the actual number from said 54 electoral districts was 36,262,560 votes. But Lenin reaffirms that between Svyatitisky's article and his account, the number of votes cast by party is largely identical.

Radkey and Spirin
Later studies often use Svyatitsky's 1918 account as their starting point for further elaboration. L. M. Spirin (1987) uses local newspapers and Russian, Belarusian and Ukrainian archival holdings to supplement Svyatitsky, whereas U.S. historian Oliver Henry Radkey predominately uses local newspapers as sources. According to Rabinovitch (2016), Spirin's account is the most complete. According to Arato (2017), Radkey is the most serious historian on the 1917 election.

Radkey uses a number of  uses broad categories in presenting the result party-wise: SRs (sometimes distinguished between left/right), Bolsheviks, Mensheviks (sometimes divided between Menshevik-Internationalists and Right-wing pro-war Mensheviks), Other Socialists (with subcategories) Kadets, Special interests (including subcategories peasants, landowners, Cossacks, middle-class, others), Religious (Orthodox, Old Believers, others), Ukrainian (with subcategories), Turkic-Tatar (with subcategories), Other Nationalities (with subcategories).

The main source for the results table is Radkey (1989), who is used as reference for district-wise results unless specified otherwise. List numbers and names are largely taken from the Soviet historian L. M. Spirin's work. Notably, one list has been included that appears in Radkey but not in Spirin (the Molokan list in Taurida, with 885 votes).

Essentially, Radkey uses 5 classifications on the completeness of the district-level electoral result in his study:

From Radkey's account, there are 294,530 "unaccounted" votes, i.e. votes that were registered in totals but without their list identity clarified.

Protasov
A more recent research effort is represented by Russian historian L. G. Protasov, whose 1997 account includes 48,401,962 votes from 75 electoral districts. His estimate is that electoral participation was around 63-64%. In comparison with other historians, Protasov uses the category "Other socialists" to include many of the national minority parties. However, a 2004 account by Protasov puts the total number of accounted votes at 47,167,621.

Protasov records 765 deputies elected from 73 electoral districts; out of them 345 SRs, 47 Ukrainian SRs, 175 Bolsheviks, 17 Mensheviks, 7 Ukrainian Social Democrats, 14 Kadets, 2 Popular Socialists, another 32 Ukrainian socialists (possibly SRs or social democrats), 13 Muslim socialists, 10 Dashnaks, 68 from other national parties, 16 Cossacks, 10 Christians and one clergyman.

District-wise results
The voting figures presented in the tables below are from Radkey (1989), unless stated otherwise.  In various districts, Radkey was not able to present a full account of the vote. In many cases the sources available to Radkey did not include all the lists in a specific district, meaning that in the account as a whole smaller parties tend to get underrepresented in many of the district-wise accounts. In some districts Radkey uses different sources for different lists, creating partially incomplete listings.

The names of elected deputies originate from Protasov (2008). Party identity has been simplified. SR lists often included labels such as 'Socialist-Revolutionaries and Congress of Peasants Deputies' or 'Earth and Will', for example, but are here just presented as SR.

Metropolitan cities

Petrograd City

Petrograd city constituted an electoral district of its own, separate from the rest of the Petrograd Governorate. Voter turnout in the capital was estimated at between 69.7% and 72%.

For the Petrograd Metropolitan district, Radkey assigns 861 votes as "unaccounted" for minor lists. Spirin presents lists 5, 10 and 13 with a total vote of 862. In the results tally below, Spirin's data is used for these 3 lists.

Moscow City

The electoral district covered the city of Moscow, separate from Moscow Governorate. Voter turnout in the city was estimated at between 65.4% and 69.7%.

North

Arkhangelsk

The electoral district covered the Arkhangelsk Governorate. Radkey's account is missing 4 uezds, representing some 25% of the electorate the Archangel electoral district.

Notably, Archangel had a different electoral system than the rest of the country, as voters voted for individual candidates rather than party lists. Notably, Arkhangelsk had a different electoral system than the rest of the country, as voters voted for individual candidates rather than party lists. Five parties had fielded their candidates in the constituency; The Kadets fielded Aleksander Isupov and Viktor Bartenev, the Socialist-Revolutionaries (supported by the Peasants' Deputies Soviet) fielded Alexey Ivanov and Mikhail Kvyatkovsky, the Bolsheviks fielded Matvei Muranov and Georgy Oppokov and the Mensheviks fielded Anatoli Zhidkov and Vladimir Bustrem. Pavel Osipov was nominated by a group of citizens from Kurlev volost in Kholmogory uezd.

Olonets

The electoral district covered the Olonets Governorate. Olonets had special electoral system, electing 2 deputies and with each voter having 2 votes.

Vologda

The electoral district covered the Vologda Governorate. Out of the 10 uezds in Vologda electoral district, the account of Rakdey has 1 uezds with a largely incomplete vote count and gaps in coverage in another 2 uezds.

In Vologda the Bolsheviks and Mensheviks had a common list. Soviet sources indicated that Social Democratic list was dominated by the Bolsheviks.

North-Western

Petrograd

The electoral district covered the Petrograd Governorate, except for the capital city itself. According to Radkey his account of the result available was incomplete, as data was missing for 7 minor lists. Radkey's account totals 446,273 votes, including 451 unaccounted votes. Soviet historian Spirin has the same account for the three major lists, but adds another 25,462 votes for the smaller lists. Spirin's account is used for the results table below.

Pskov

The electoral district covered the Pskov Governorate. There was a 60.3% voter turnout in the district.

Novgorod

The electoral district covered the Novgorod Governorate. Whilst Novgorod was an agrarian province, the Bolsheviks obtained a good vote. This might have been due to the fact that many inhabitants were accustomed to perform seasonal work in nearby Petrograd. 4 local peasants lists did not qualify to run in the election.

Baltics

Estonia

The electoral district covered the Autonomous Governorate of Estonia.

Voter turnout stood at 56.6% in the Estonia electoral district. The Bolsheviks and Estonian Labour Party had their strongest support in Reval and northern Estonia. Bolsheviks obtained 47.6% of the votes cast in Reval. The Democratic Bloc obtained 53.4% in Tartu, and did also get a good number of votes in southern Estonia. Notably, the Bolsheviks benefited from popular discontent with the failure of the Provisional Government to follow through on its promises of self-determination for Estonia.

Soldiers stationed at garrisons in Estonia didn't vote in the Estonian district, but in the Baltic Fleet constituency.

Livonia

The electoral district covered the Livonia Governorate, as well as the parts of the Courland Governorate not under German occupation. However, at the time Riga was under German occupation so no vote took place there.

In Radkey's account some 9,000 votes are missing from 9 uezds.

White Russia

Vitebsk

The electoral district covered the Vitebsk Governorate.

Minsk

The electoral district consisted of the Minsk Governorate and the parts of the Vilna Governorate and the Kovno Governorate that were not under German occupation. Notably, the soldiers based in the garrison in Minsk voted in the Western Front electoral district rather than the Minsk electoral district. According to Radkey, his count of the result in Minsk is largely complete, only lacking 3 out of 25 volosts Mozyr uezd. These 3 volosts had 16,755 eligible voters.

Mogilev

The electoral district covered the Mogilev Governorate.

According to Radkey the vote count in Mogilev is largely incomplete. He claims to have the data for Gomel (with the votes for all 11 lists), Mogilev (with votes for the 7 most voted lists) and Orsha (with votes for the 6 most votes lists) towns as well as 80 precincts in Gomel uezd (but in these precincts, only the vote for SR and Bolshevik lists). The account of Soviet historian L. M. Spirin, shown to the right in the table and which Radkey did not consider reliable, includes a much greater number of votes accounted for the Mogilev electoral district.

Smolensk

The electoral district covered the Smolensk Governorate. 2 volost-level lists were barred from participating in the election. List no. 3, endorsed by Smolensk Provincial Council of SR Party and the Smolensk Provincial Congress of Peasants Deputies, was headed by E.K. Breshko-Breshkovskaia and Andrei Argunov. The Socialist-Revolutionary and Menshevik lists formed an electoral bloc. Likewise Lists 2 and 4 formed an electoral bloc.

The Bolsheviks won some 75% of the vote in the rural Sychevka uezd, obtaining 23,984 out of 32,007 votes cast in the uezd.

Central Industrial Region

Moscow

The electoral district covered the Moscow Governorate, except for the city of Moscow. According to Radkey's account, only few votes are missing from the summary (one military voting box in Moscow uezd, the votes from a single volost in Bronnitsy uezd and the votes for smaller parties in Serpukhov uezd).

Tver

The electoral district covered the Tver Governorate. Radkey lists the Tver result as 'somewhat incomplete'.

Yaroslavl

The electoral district covered the Yaroslavl Governorate.

Kostroma

The electoral district covered the Kostroma Governorate.

Vladimir

The electoral district covered the Vladimir Governorate. Vladimir was heavily industrialized, second only to Moscow itself. There were many textile mills in Ivanovo-Voznesensky, Out of 13 uezd, SR won in 2; Viazniki (east of industrial belt), an area with hemp and linen production where SRs scored 42,4%, and further east in Gorokhovets uezd, an area with no factories where SRs scored 57.4%.

Kaluga

The electoral district covered the Kaluga Governorate.

Tula

The electoral district covered the Tula Governorate. The votes from the city of Tula and 10 out 12 uezds are complete, according to Radkey.  The votes from Yefremov uezd and one of the volosts of Odoyev uezd are not covered in Radkey's account.

Central Black Earth Region

Ryazan

The electoral district covered the Ryazan Governorate. Radkey's account is missing the vote from Egoriev uezd, 1 out of 12 uezds in the electoral district.

Oryol

The electoral district covered the Oryol Governorate.

Kursk

The electoral district covered the Kursk Governorate. Kursk was an agrarian, Black Earth province with no industries. The Bolshevik vote was attributed to soldiers returning home from the front.

Voronezh

The electoral district covered the Voronezh Governorate.

Tambov

The electoral district covered the Tambov Governorate. 73% electoral participation was reported, as the SRs had a good mobilization capacity among the peasantry. In the Spassko-Kashminskaia canton, Morshansk uezd the SR local government banned the Bolshevik election campaign, alleging that the Bolsheviks were German spies.

Penza

The electoral district covered the Penza Governorate. In Penza town there were 49,741 eligible voters, out of whom 17,583 voted (35%).

Volga

Nizhny Novgorod

The electoral district covered the Nizhny Novgorod Governorate. Only in the Nizhny Novgorod constituency could the combined forces of clergy and far right make an electoral impact. The Christian Union for Faith and Fatherland had a relative success.

Simbirsk

The electoral district covered the Simbirsk Governorate. Electoral participation was reported at around 58%.

Kazan

The electoral district covered the Kazan Governorate. 66% turnout was reported. The Chuvash largely voted for the SRs, and the local SR party branch was dominated by leftist elements. The Tatars voters were split between leftist and rightist lists.

Samara

The electoral district covered the Samara Governorate. Electoral turnout was at 54.86%. Out of 95 different lists submitted, 79 were turned down (out of which approximately 42 lists were denied due to late submission).

Saratov

The electoral district covered the Saratov Governorate. Saratov had been one of the early strongholds of the SRs. Kerensky was one of the SR candidates, but many voters scratched his name from the list (and thus made their votes invalid). It was politically turbulent, also during the election. In Saratov Bolshevik campaigners were frequently attacked by rich farmers. Whilst the SR won in the largely agrarian district, the Bolsheviks had a strong showing, with strong support from soldiers and from the industrial city of Tsaritsyn.

Astrakhan

The electoral district covered parts of the Astrakhan Governorate, excluding the areas of the Bukey Horde and the Kalmyk Steppe. Radkey's account is incomplete, with some votes missing.

Kama-Ural

Vyatka

The electoral district covered the Vyatka Governorate. Radkey's account only includes full result for 3 lists (Bolsheviks, Mensheviks, Orthodox), albeit the number of votes for the Orthodox list has been rounded off. The real vote of the other nine lists, according to Radkey, would have been more than double that what is accounted for.

Perm

The electoral district covered the Perm Governorate.

Ufa

The electoral district covered the Ufa Governorate.

Orenburg

The electoral district covered the Orenburg Governorate. According to Radkey, his account of the Bashkir Federalist vote is underestimated, believing that the real figure would land at around 100,000.

Ukraine

Kiev

The electoral district covered the Kiev Governorate. Kiev was a historical Black Hundred stronghold, and monarchists got some 3% of the votes in the district.

Volhynia

The electoral district covered the Volhynian Governorate. The western parts of the electoral district were under German or Austrian occupation. Radkey expresses concern that the votes account from Volynia (exclusively brought from the 1918 study by Sviatitski) may have been largely incomplete, possibly an effect of the proximity to the battle lines.

Podolia

The electoral district covered the Podolian Governorate. Podolia was close to the frontline. Radkey cites that the Ukrainian Social Democratic Labour Party organ Robitchna Gazeta reported that elections were held in Podolia between Dec 3-7, and presented results from 9 out of 12 uezds, but Robitchna Gazeta'''s party tally greater than the vote cast in the 9 uezds, possibly pointing to results included from the remaining 3 uezds.

Chernigov

The electoral district covered the Chernigov Governorate. Chernigov was an agrarian province. The Bolshevik Party was absent in most uezds and weak in others. But returning soldiers, about a quarter of the electorate, boosted the Bolshevik vote.

Spirin is the source for the results tally from Chernigov. There is a difference of just 16 votes in the total tallies of Spirin and Radkey, but Spirin is more precise on the identities of the candidate lists in the fray.

Poltava

The electoral district covered the Poltava Governorate. Poltava was an agrarian province. Voter turnout was reported at 74%.

The Russian SRs (dominated by the left) ran a joint list with the Ukrainian SRs (also dominated by its leftist faction). The Selianska Spilka ('Village Union'), the agrarian wing of the Ukrainian SRs, confronted the Farmers (Landowners) Party, excluding Landowners from local election commissions. The campaign against the Landowners Party occasionally took a violent shape.

The lists of the Folkspartey and the Jewish National Electoral Committee formed an electoral bloc, likewise the Poalei Zion and the United Socialist Jewish Workers Party lists formed an electoral bloc. Three minor Ukrainian lists formed an electoral bloc: the Ukrainian Social Democrats and the Ukrainian Socialist-Federalists and the Ukrainian National Republican Group.

Kharkov

The electoral district covered the Kharkov Governorate. The SR list in Kharkov was dominated by the left-wing, contesting jointly with the Ukrainian SRs. The rightwing pro-war SR faction had its own list, headed by E.K. Breshko-Breshkovskaia. Whilst trailing far behind the SRs across the country-side, the Bolsheviks won the election in Kharkov city.

Spirin is the source for the result from Kharkov. There is a difference of just 873 votes between Radkey and Spirin in the total tally for Kharkov electoral district, but Spirin is more precise on the identities of the lists in the fray.

Yekaterinoslav

The electoral district covered the Yekaterinoslav Governorate. Yekaterinoslav was a large province; ethnically and economically diverse. The Yekaterinoslav electoral district recorded the highest vote for a landowners list in the country. List 1 Landowners and Nonpartisan Progressives gathered 26,597 votes (2.2%), and was headed by Mikhail Rodzianko (an Octobrist leader, having served as the presiding officer in the 3rd and 4th Dumas, elected on the Stolypin franchise).

Kherson

The electoral district covered the Kherson Governorate. According to Radkey, the Odessa city results appeared complete, the Odessa uezd possibly incomplete, the Kherson uezd having results from 195 out of 223 voting centers, no indication about whether 2 other uezds' results were complete or not. From the remaining 2 uezds the results were missing altogether.

South
Bessarabia

Radkey's account is substantially incomplete. According to Radkey, only the results from Kishinev and 3 out of 8 uezds could be gathered by scholars. The 5 uezds left out of the count were more populous. Two other sets have been published: one by Moldovan historian Gheorghe Cojocaru, providing a detailed account of the civilian votes, covering almost two thirds of the ones cast in Bessarabia, and a reportedly complete set provided by Soviet author G. Ustinov. 17 lists were in the fray in Bessarabia. The demographics of the district were divided between Romanians (48%), Ukrainians (20%) and Russians (8%). Among the elected deputies, SR deputies were Jewish or Russian, whilst the peasant soviet deputies were Romanian.

As per Serge, some 600,000 people took part in the vote, with the Peasant soviet obtaining some 200,000 votes, SRs 200,000 votes, Jewish national list 60,000, Kadets 40,000 and the Moldavian National Party 14,000.

Taurida

The electoral district covered the Taurida Governorate. Taurida had a 54.74% voter turnout. Radkey's account is missing Berdiansk uezd with some 3,400 electors and Vodiansk volost of Melitopol uezd. All in all there were 753 precincts in the Taurida electoral district.

South-East
Don Cossack Region

The electoral district covered the Don Host Oblast.

Stavropol

The electoral district covered the Stavropol Governorate, as well as the Karanogai precinct (which was part of the Terek Oblast). In Stavropol town the Bolsheviks won 47.6% of the vote. Likewise, in Pyatigorsk the Bolsheviks won some 8,000 votes, half of the votes from the town.

Kuban-Black Sea

The electoral district covered the Kuban Oblast and the Black Sea Governorate. Kuban was fully engulfed by civil war by the time of the vote. 16 seats had been allotted to the Kuban-Black Sea electoral district, but the election was only held in Ekaterinodar and some surrounding villages were the Kuban Territorial Council was in control. Spirin gives the following result for Ekaterinodar;

Caucasus
Ter-Dagestan

The electoral district covered the Terek Oblast (except the Karanogai precinct and the aimak of the Kalmyks) and the Dagestan Oblast. Voting was delayed in Ter-Dagestan and was held between November 26 and December 5. In some areas the votes were counted but not reported, in other areas votes were left uncounted. In Radkey's account a complete result was only available for Vladikavkaz city. He includes sporadic results of the major parties in some towns and garrisons. Radkey's account contains no results from rural areas.

Bolsheviks obtained 44% of the vote in Vladikavkaz. This situation could be compared to that by March 1917 the Bolshevik Party had been so weak in the city that it had been decided to form a joint Bolshevik-Menshevik Party Committee in the city.

Pricaspian

The Pricaspian electoral district, which included areas of the Kalmyk steppe of the Astrakhan Governorate, was thinly populated. One seat was assigned to the constituency. A list was submitted, signed by 137 electors, with the 33-year old lawyer Sandzhi Bayanovich Bayanov as its candidate. Due to late arrival of electoral material, the vote was postponed to November 26–28, 1917. The vote was reportedly held on these dates, in some places with very low turnout. Bayanov received a majority of votes.

Transcaucasus

The electoral district covered the Baku Governorate, the Elizavetpol Governorate, the Erivan Governorate, the Kutais Governorate, the Tiflis Governorate, the Batum Oblast, the Kars Oblast, the Sukhum Okrug and the Zakatal Okrug.

The three largest parties in Transcaucasus were the Mensheviks, the Musavat Party and the Armenian Revolutionary Federation (Dashnaksiun). Whilst the Mensheviks were the most voted party, here Menshevism had become intertwined with Georgian nationalism. Soon after the election, the Georgian Mensheviks would become openly nationalistic. Bolsheviks won the election Baku city (followed closely by Musavat and Dashnaksiun), Ittihad won the elections in the rural areas of Baku uezd, in the villages of the Absheron Peninsula. Musavat won most of the Azerbaijani vote in Baku guberniia, followed by Ittehad. In Tiflis the Bolsheviks quadrupled their vote compared to the July 1917 city duma election.

The numbers in the column to the left originate from Hovannisian (1967) and Vestnik Evrazii (2004) The source for Vestnik Evrazii for the results stems from the State Archive of the Russian Federation.

These two references present a more complete account than that of Radkey. Radkey's account lists a total of 1,887,453 votes, including 215,121 unspecified 'residue' votes. Radkey's effort to map the votes in Transcaucasus was frustrated by the insistence of Soviet sources to lump parties like Musavat and Dashnaksiun into a single bloc.

Between Hovannisian and Vestnik Evrazii, the votes for the Mensheviks, Kadets, SRs and Bolsheviks are identical. Vestnik Evrazii presents the vote for the Popular Socialist list, which is not detailed in Hovannasian. Vestnik Evrazii groups the Dashnaks, the Muslim Socialist Bloc and Hummet together (825,672 votes) and 728,206 for Bourgeois parties (presumably including Musavat). In the case of Musavat, Hummet, Ittihad and Dashnaks, the figures from Hovannisian are used. Hovannisian does not present a total of votes, so the total from Vestnik Evrazii is utilized instead.

Comparing the account from Hovannisian with that of Swietochowski (2004) the numbers for the Mensheviks, Musavat, the Muslim Socialist Bloc, SRs, Hummet and Ittihad are identical. The minor discrepancies between Hovannisian and Swietochowski are different vote for Bolshevik list (93,581 in Hovannisian and Vestnik Evrazii, 95,581 in Switeochowski), the Dashnaks got 40 votes more in Swietochowski's account and Swietochowski lists a total of 2,455,274 (plus 2,172 compared to Vestnik Evrazii). Maḣmudov (2004) and Balaev (1998) carries the same numbers as Swietochowski.

The results in the column to the right is from the account of Soviet historian L. M. Spirin. Spirin's total is missing about half a million votes compared to the other accounts.

Siberia
Tobolsk

The electoral district covered the Tobolsk Governorate. Tobolsk hosted one of only 2 undivided Social Democratic lists in the fray across the country. Soviet sources indicated that the Social Democratic list was Menshevik-dominated.

Soviet sources reported voter turnout at a mere 33.5%.

Steppes

The electoral district covered the Akmolinsk Oblast and the Semipalatinsk Oblast. According to Wade (2004), it is unclear whether the election was carried through to completion in the electoral district.

Radkey's account only includes votes from Omsk and surroundings;

This account of the vote in Semipalatinsk uezd comes from the work of Spirin;

Tomsk

The electoral district covered the Tomsk Governorate. The SR list won a landslide victory, drawing the support from the rural areas. In the Novonikolayevsk uyezd the SRs obtained 95.3% of the votes cast, followed by Kainsk uyezd (91%), Kuznetsk uyezd (90.8%), Mariinsk uyezd (88.6%), Tomsk uyezd (73.6%) and Togur uyezd (64.6%). The Bolsheviks fared better in industrial centers; obtaining some 36% of the vote at the Kemerovo mine and chemical plant, some 32% of the votes were cast at the Anzhersky mines and 25.8% of the votes at the Sudzhensk mines (both in present-day Anzhero-Sudzhensk).

Altai

The electoral district covered the Altai Governorate.

Yenisei

The electoral district covered the Yenisei Governorate. Moreover, the Russian citizens living in the Uryankhay Kray formed part of the constituency.

The SRs and Menshevik lists formed an electoral bloc, whilst the Bolsheviks and the leftist dissident SR list formed a second electoral bloc.

According to Radkey the results from Krasnoyarsk city and 5 out of 6 uezds appeared complete, with the thinly populated Turukhansk uezd missing.

Irkutsk

The electoral district covered the Irkutsk Governorate.

Transbaikal

The electoral district covered the Transbaikal Oblast.

Priamur

The Priamur electoral district consisted of the Amur Oblast, the Maritime Province and the Sakhalin Oblast. The election was held on time in the constituency. From the Maritime Province the results were, according to Radkey, seemingly complete. In areas north of the Amur river some problems in voting occurred, with 312 polling stations reporting and 77 did not (another reference stated that no election had been held in some 50 polling stations).

The SRs had suffered a four-way split in the constituency, with the branches in Amur and Maritime contesting separately. Ahead of the election the Maritime Province Peasants Soviets threw out the SR party representatives and fielded a separate list (in Amur, however, the peasants soviets stayed loyal to the SR party). There was also a left SR list, distinctively urban.

Chinese Eastern Railroad

The Chinese Eastern Railroad electoral district was located outside the borders of Russia. Four candidates were nominated for the Chinese Eastern Railroad seat; Lieutenant General Dmitri Horvath (the Chinese Eastern Railroad Zone administrator since 1902) ran as the Kadet candidate, representing the pre-revolutionary status quo. Nikolai Strelkov of the Railwaymens' Union contested as the Menshevik candidate, the Jewish businessman and Chair of the Chinese Eastern Railroad Executive Committee Faytel Volfovich was the SR candidate and the ensign and Harbin Soviet chairman Ryutin the Bolshevik candidate.Wolff, David. Harbin ou le Dernier Avatar de la politique impériale russe in Revue des Études Slaves. 2001. 73-2-3 pp. 293-303

The vote was held for the Chinese Eastern Railroad seat on November 29, 1917. The voter turnout stood at around 60%.

According to a contemporary account published in the organ of the Nikolsk-Ussuriysky Soviet (whose totals differ somewhat from the figures of Radkey), the vote in Harbin was won by Strelkov (4,874 votes, 31.74%), followed by Horvath (4,450 votes, 28.98%), Ryutin (4,412 votes, 28.73%) and Volfovich (1,620 votes, 10.55%). In the 26 precincts of the western line, Ryutin was the most vote candidate (5,991 votes, 38.25%), followed by Strelkov (5,845 votes, 37.32%), Volfovich (2,519 votes, 16.08%) and Horvath (1,307 votes, 8.35%). In the four precincts of the eastern line, Ryutin emerged as the winner with 1,461 votes (39.84%), followed by Strelkov (1,187 votes, 32.37%), Volfovich (831 votes, 22.66%) and Horvath (188 votes, 5.13%).

Yakutsk

The electoral district covered the Yakutsk Oblast. An election was held and deputies elected, but Radkey was unable to trace the any voting figures.

Kamchatka

The electoral district covered the Kamchatka Oblast. The vote was held in the Kamchatka electoral on October 29, 1917, well ahead of the rest of the country, in order to allow its sole deputy to be able to catch the last steamship to Petrograd to attend the opening of the Constituent Assembly. Radkey claims to only have been able to trace results from the town of Zavoyko, but the Zavoyko poll was disqualified as the vote had been held one day in advance. 275 people had voted in Zavoyko, 258 of them for SR, 9 for Social Democrats and 8 for others.

Turkestan
Horde

The Horde (or 'Orda') electoral district covered the areas of the Bukey Horde in the Transvolga. Khanskaya Stavka was the administrative center of the electoral district. According to Radkey, two lists had registered in the Horde electoral district. As per Radkey's account, there was no information on whether election had been held. As per Wade (2004), members of the local revolutionary committee began arresting the District Election Commission officials as the vote tallying was ongoing.

Uralsk

The electoral district covered the Ural Oblast as well as the Mangyshlak uezd of the Transcaspian Oblast (except for areas inhabited by Turkmens).

Turgai

The electoral district covered the Turgai Oblast. According to Radkey the vote was held in one uezd, but that the result was not known. Nevertheless, Soviet sources indicate voting took place across the district. Soviet historian L. M. Spirin (whose data is used for the results table below) lists 281,782 votes cast for three different candidate lists. Notably, Radkey rejects these results as unreliable.

Transcaspian

The electoral district covered the Transcaspian Oblast, except for most of the Mangyshlak uezd (only the volosts inhabited by Turkmens remained part of the Transcaspian electoral district). The Transcaspian electoral district was assigned 2 seats in the Constituent Assembly. According to Radkey, an election was held but results not known. Per Wade (2004), it is certain that no election took place in the Transcaspian electoral district.

Samarkand

The electoral district covered the Samarkand Oblast. Samarkand was assigned 5 seats. According to Radkey, an election was held but results were not known to him.

Amu Darya

The electoral district covered the Amu Darya Division of the Syr-Darya Oblast. According to Radkey, it is not known whether voting took place. One seat had been allotted to Amu Darya. Per Wade (2004), it is certain that no election took place in Amu Darya.

Syr Darya

The electoral district covered the Syr-Darya Oblast, except for the Amu Darya Division. Voting in Syr Darya was postponed until mid-Dec 1917, then to January 19, 1918. In the end no vote ever took place. Nine seats had been allotted to Syr Darya.

Fergana

The electoral district covered the Fergana Oblast. An election was held and deputies elected, but Radkey was unable to trace the any voting figures. Seemingly, per Soviet sources cited by Radkey, there were 5 deputies elected from Fergana, out of whom 1 SR.

The results in the table below are based on data from Soviet historian L. M. Spirin. U.S. historian Oliver Henry Radkey rejected these results as unreliable.

Semirechie

The electoral district covered the Semirechie Oblast. The electoral battle in Semirechie stood between a general soviet list (SRs and Mensheviks) and the Kirgiz-Cossack alliance. The Bolshevik list had been banned.

Military districts
Baltic Fleet

The electoral district covered the military forces and employees and workers at bases under the command of the Baltic Fleet. The Baltic Fleet was a revolutionary  bastion. Electoral participation stood at around 70%. 76% of sailors voted, but the sailors were outnumbered by workers and soldiers at the naval bases. Baltic Fleet used a separate electoral system, where the voter could vote for two individual candidates rather than fixed party lists.

The election campaign received plenty attention in the fleet newspapers. The campaign of non-Bolshevik candidates was largely confined to Helsingfors. The outcome of the vote indicated strong dissatisfaction with the performance of the Provisional Government, as the combined Bolshevik/Left SR vote stood at around 85% (the highest of all electoral constituencies nationwide). Radkey claims Dybenko was the most voted Bolshevik candidate, placing Lenin second. Dybenko was himself a sailor, and likewise in the case of the SRs sailor candidates Shisko and Maslov scored higher votes than non-sailor political leaders.

Saul (1978) expresses strong concerns over the accuracy of the result presented by Radkey. Saul (1978) reports the following result from the Helsingfors region of the Baltic Fleet electoral district (with results from 97 out of 100 electoral precincts); 22,670 votes for Dybenko, 22,237 votes for Lenin, 13,617 votes for Shishko, 12,906 votes for Proshian, 7,620 votes for Maslov, 7,351 votes for Tsion, 855 votes for Demchinsky and 838 votes for Rengarten. According to Soviet sources the non-partisan group got one percent of the votes in Helsingfors. In Kronstadt an 84% vote for the Bolsheviks was recorded. On the battleships the Bolsheviks won some 70% of the vote, whilst the (left) SRs dominated the vote in the Åbo–Åland region (which had smaller ships).

Black Sea Fleet
The electoral district covered the military forces and employees and workers at bases under the command of the Black Sea Fleet.

Northern Front

The constituency covered the Northern Front of the Russian Army. And apart from the Northern Front itself, the electoral district also included the Russian troops stationed in Finland (except those under the Baltic Fleet command) as well as the Lake Peipus Flotilla. Voter turnout stood at 72.36482% per official records.

Western Front

The electoral district covered the Western Front of the Russian Army. The result for Muslim Socialists stems from a newspaper report in Russkiye Vedomosti'', which had data from 472 out of 602 voting centres.

South-Western Front

The electoral district covered the South-Western Front of the Russian Army.

Romanian Front

The electoral district covered the Romanian Front of the Russian Army. Moreover, the constituency covered the Danube Flotilla. To Radkey some 12,000-15,000 votes appeared to be missing from official records.

Caucasian Front

The electoral district covered the Caucasian Front of the Russian Army. Moreover, it included the Urmia-Van Flotilla.

Spirin's account of the election result only gives a rough estimate, with 360,000 votes for the Socialist-Revolutionaries and 60,000 votes for the Bolsheviks. The account of Radkey only includes votes from Erzerum fortress, with 16,824 votes. However, the Ukrainian vote in Erzerum was missing in the source material available to Radkey.

Russian forces in France and the Balkans

The Russian Expeditionary Force in France and the Salonika front formed an electoral district of its own, with some 50,000 eligible voters. According to Wade (2004) it is unclear whether any election took place in the electoral district.

Notes

References

1917
Russian Constituent Assembly